Professor Mark Watson-Gandy (born 8 November 1967) is a British lawyer and educationalist, specialising in UK insolvency law. 

He serves as Chairman of the Biometrics and Forensic Ethics Group, a position he has held since 2019.

Early life and education
Born in 1967 to Alastair Watson-Gandy and Barbara née Madry, scion of the Watson-Gandy-Brandreth gentry family, he was educated at Dr Challoner's Grammar School before going up to the University of Essex, where he graduated with the degree of Bachelor of Laws (LLB). In Scotland, Watson-Gandy is accorded the courtesy territorial designation "of Myrton" as a feudal baron.

Career
Watson-Gandy was called to the Bar in 1990 at the Inner Temple and in 2013 to the Eastern Caribbean Bar (British Virgin Islands). He is a member of Three Stone Chambers in Lincoln's Inn. Since 1999, he has been a Visiting Professor of the University of Westminster, where he has pioneered its LLM degree in Corporate Finance Law, and is a Special Lecturer at Cass Business School.
 
In 2000, he was appointed by Lord Williams of Mostyn as a Junior Counsel to the Crown serving until 2012. In 2010, he was Counsel to the Conference of Bishops for the State Visit of Pope Benedict XVI to the United Kingdom. He then advised Gurkha veterans for the All-Party Parliamentary Group Enquiry on Gurkha Welfare.
 
In 2013, Watson-Gandy represented Craig Whyte in litigation over the financing of his ill-fated acquisition of Rangers Football Club. He also served as counsel to the court-appointed trustee in litigation leading to the overturning of the UK bankruptcy of Tom McFeely, a property developer and former IRA hunger striker. He was counsel for the court-appointed amicus curiæ in litigation over the collapse of the Stanford International Bank in Antigua and of Fairfield Sentry (Bernie Madoff's investment fund) in the British Virgin Islands. He later successfully represented the court-appointed administrators of Cambridge Analytica.
 
From 2019, Watson-Gandy serves as Chairman of the Biometrics and Forensic Ethics Group, a Home Office non-departmental public body, formerly known as the National DNA Database Ethics Group.  Also a member of the Home Office Science Advisory Council, he was formerly Chairman of Mental Health First Aid (MHFA) England and the Pure Cremation Group.
 
In 2022, The Catholic Herald featured Watson-Gandy in its list of “Catholic leaders of today”, the UK’s 100 most influential lay Roman Catholics.

Appointments
Watson-Gandy's appointments to boards of companies as well as not-for-profit organizations include:
 Chairman of Kids MBA Ltd;
 Non-Executive Director of the Institute of Certified Bookkeepers (FICB);
 Chancellor of the British Association of the Sovereign Military Order of Malta.
Liveryman (Master for 2022/23) of the Scriveners' Company.

Publications

Books
 Simple Contract Law - published in London 2020
 KidsMBA: How to build a successful business - published in London 2018
 Personal Insolvency Practice: Litigation Procedure & Precedents 2nd Edition - published by Wildy & Sons, London, 2018
 Corporate Insolvency Practice: Litigation Procedure & Precedents 2nd Edition - published by Wildy & Sons, London 2017
 Tolley's Company Secretary's Review – Corporate Precedents: Directors - published by Wildy & Sons, London 2013
 Personal Insolvency Practice: Litigation Procedure & Precedents – published by Wildy & Sons, London 2012
 Corporate Insolvency Practice: Litigation Procedure & Precedents – published by Wildy & Sons, London 2010
 Watson-Gandy on Accountants – Law, Practice and Procedure, 2nd Edition, published by Wildy & Sons, London 2008
 Watson-Gandy on Accountants – Law, Practice and Procedure, 1st Edition, published by Wildy & Sons, London 2000
 Beyond the Peradventure, published in London 1991.

Editorships
Watson-Gandy has co-edited Butterworths Corporate Law Service, LexisNexis (Company Law: co-editor since 2008), having previously been assistant editor of the Family Court Reporter, local government editor of Justice of the Peace Magazine and editor of Litigation, the legal journal.

Writing and speaking
Since 1997 Watson-Gandy has contributed a monthly column to Business Money, the commercial finance magazine. He also writes and speaks regularly in the media on legal matters and business education.

Personal life
On 30 April 1997, Watson-Gandy married Emanuella Giavara, EU copyright legislation advocate and daughter of Dott. Dionisi Giuseppe Giavara.
 
He and his wife live at Blackheath, London SE3, and have two children.

Honours and distinctions

  Most Venerable Order of Saint John: CStJ
  SMOM: Knight of the Sovereign Military Order of Malta
  Holy See: Knight of the Order of Saint Gregory the Great
  Two Sicilies: Knight of the Sacred Military Constantinian Order of Saint George
  SMOM: Cross pro Merito Melitensi;
Freeman of the City of London
Freeman of the Goldsmiths' Company
Master of the Scriveners' Company.

References

Living people
1967 births
British Roman Catholics
21st-century Roman Catholics
Lairds
Alumni of the University of Essex
Members of the Inner Temple
People educated at Dr Challoner's Grammar School
Academics of the University of Westminster
English barristers
British television executives
British non-fiction writers
Knights of Malta
Knights Commander of the Order of St Gregory the Great
Commanders of the Order of St John
Recipients of the Order pro Merito Melitensi